A fan convention (also known as a con or fan meeting) is an event in which fans of a particular topic gather to participate and hold programs and other events, and to meet experts, famous personalities, and each other. Some also incorporate commercial activity. The term dates back to at least 1942.

Overview
Fan conventions are traditionally organized by fans on a not-for-profit basis, though some events catering to fans are run by commercial interests for profit. Many conventions have award presentations relating to their genre (such as the Hugo Awards which have been presented at The World Science Fiction Convention (WorldCon) since 1953). 

At commercial events, performers often give out autographs to the fans, sometimes in exchange for a flat appearance fee, and sometimes may perform songs that have no relevance to the shows or otherwise entertain the fans. Commercial conventions are usually quite expensive and are hosted in hotels. There is often tight security for the celebrities to protect against potentially fanatic fans. Such features are not common at traditional science-fiction conventions, which are more oriented toward science fiction as a mode of literature, rather than toward visual media, and do not include any paid appearances by famous personalities, and maintain a less caste-like differentiation between professional and fan. 

Anime conventions, gaming conventions, filk-music conventions, and furry conventions may all be considered derivatives of science-fiction conventions, which began in the late 1930s. 

 While the wearing of costumes—and even a costume competition (known as a "masquerade")—has been an occasional feature of traditional science-fiction conventions since Morojo and Forrest J Ackerman wore them during the First World Science Fiction Convention in 1939, this has never been the dominant feature of such events. From press coverage of comic book and anime conventions has arisen the widespread image of fans' tendency to dress up as their favorite characters in elaborate costumes (known as cosplay in anime terminology) that are time-consuming and/or expensive to assemble.

Different conventions use different methods to count their attendance, which leads to some confusion about actual convention size.

History 
Fan conventions for various genres of entertainment extend to the first conventions held in the 1930s. However, while a few conventions were created in various parts of the world within the period between 1935-1960, the number of convention establishments increased slightly in the 1960s and then increased dramatically in the 1970s, with many of the largest conventions in the modern era being established during the latter decade. Impetuses for further establishment of local fan conventions include:

 The return of superhero characters and franchises during the Silver Age of Comic Books (1956-1970).
 Science fiction adaptations for television serials (e.g., Star Trek) in the 1960s-1970s.
 The growth of role-playing (in the 1970s and 1980s) as a genre of tabletop, live-action and eventually video/computer gaming, which not only inspired roleplay of favorite characters in full-body costumes but also inspired existing franchises to adapt their themes for said methods of gaming.
 The growth in home taping (starting with VHS in the late 1970s) of television broadcasts, including popular serials.
 The growth of computerized communication, including the Internet and Internet-dependent applications in the 1980s and 1990s.

See also
Science fiction fandom
Fantasy fandom
List of fan conventions by date of founding
List of anime conventions
List of comic book conventions
List of furry conventions
List of gaming conventions
List of multi-genre conventions
List of professional wrestling conventions
List of science-fiction conventions

References